Edinburgh District is a Scottish amateur rugby union team which plays in the amateur Scottish Inter-District Championship. Its draws its players mainly from the Edinburgh area, as well as others from the rest of east central Scotland; roughly corresponding to the old Lothian regional council area. Historically the Edinburgh District team played matches against touring teams visiting Scotland from abroad, and also competed in the Scottish Inter-District Championship.

The Edinburgh District rugby union team was founded in 1872. The team played the world's first inter-district match that year against Glasgow District rugby union team.

The amateur Edinburgh District side evolved into the professional Edinburgh Rugby side in 1996; one year after rugby union allowed professionalism in 1995. However the amateur district is still used for the representation of amateur players in the Inter-District Championship; and this amateur championship guides the selection of Scotland Club XV international players.

Formation

The Edinburgh District side was formed in 1872 to play against a Glasgow District side.

The teams met on 23 November 1872 at Burnbank Park and Edinburgh won 1 drop goal – 0 in a 20-a-side fixture. This is the oldest inter-district match in the world and to mark this the current Glasgow Warriors and Edinburgh Rugby sides play for the 1872 Cup every year.

The first Edinburgh team in 1872:

 A. Ross (Wanderers), J. Patullo (Craigmount), Thomas Roger Marshall (Edinburgh Academicals), W. St. Clair Grant (Craigmount), J. Junor (Royal High School), James Andrew Whitelock Mein (Edinburgh Academicals), and E. Thew (Merchistonians)
 Francis Moncreiff (captain), R. W. Irvine, E. M. Bannerman, James Finlay (Edinburgh Academicals), Angus Buchanan, Alexander Petrie, and M. Sanderson (Royal High School), Charles Cathcart and John Lisle Hall MacFarlane (Edinburgh University), Tom Whittington (Merchistonians), Benjamin Blyth II (Merchistonians), J. Forsyth and A. R. Stewart (Wanderers)

Selection of representative players

Often to aid the selection process of Edinburgh District's players a trial match was played.

In Edinburgh's case a trial match of hopefuls were divided into Stripes and Plain teams, so the players could impress the selectors.

Early history

The Glasgow v Edinburgh district fixture was more or less played annually. The first 15 a side match was played in 1876. Edinburgh won the first fixtures and it wasn't until 1881 that Glasgow won at the thirteenth attempt. Glasgow then held dominance until 1887 when once more Edinburgh won again. From the 1880s to the close of the 1890s Edinburgh won a total of only four times in 20-years. The tide turned back in Edinburgh's favour in 1898. With only a solitary Glasgow win in 1905, Edinburgh held sway until 1914.

The games were postponed during the First World War period. After 50-years at Burnbank - the West of Scotland ground in Woodlands, Glasgow – the Glasgow v Edinburgh fixture moved to Glasgow Academical's ground at Anniesland, Glasgow, in 1922. This move prompted yet another shift in balance as Glasgow once again became the dominant force of the two districts.

Touring sides

Edinburgh often played matches against international and non-international touring teams. Occasionally both Glasgow and Edinburgh would field joint teams against the international touring teams.

Scottish Inter-District Championship

Two other Scottish districts South and North and Midlands had also been formed and there was regular matches between the four Scottish districts as well as against the touring sides.

The Scottish Inter-District Championship was established in the 1953–54 season. The Glasgow District, Edinburgh, South and North and Midlands sides would play off to see which district was best in Scotland. Occasionally London Scottish or an Anglo-Scots team was also invited into this championship.

Edinburgh v North and Midlands 20 November 1965 match report
Edinburgh v Glasgow 4 December 1965 match report
Edinburgh v North and Midlands 4 November 1967 match report
Edinburgh v Glasgow 22 December 1973 match reportReport2
Edinburgh v North and Midlands 29 December 1973 match report
Edinburgh v Glasgow 7 December 1974 match report

Effect of professionalism

With the advent of professionalism in 1995, the Scottish Rugby Union realised that not even the best semi-professional Scottish club teams could compete in the new Professional Era in rugby union, which was beginning to gain great momentum in the professional leagues of the Southern Hemisphere and the Northern Hemisphere.

In an attempt to stay in touch with the leading nations the SRU formed four professional teams out of the four amateur districts of Scotland in 1996. It was these newly professional teams that would represent Scotland in the Heineken Cup and in the Celtic League. The amateur Edinburgh District side was to become the professional Edinburgh Rugby side.

For the subsequent history of the professional Edinburgh rugby district team from 1996, see Edinburgh rugby.

Rebirth of the amateur district

Edinburgh District as an amateur district, will return in the 2022–23 Amateur Scottish Inter-District Championship. Its Head Coach will be Bob McKillop, previously a Scotland age-grade coach, aided by assistant coaches Alex Hagart (Stewart’s Melville), Mark Cairns (Currie Chieftains) and Iain Bethinussen (Edinburgh Academical).

McKillop noted:
Having grown up in an era when the Inter-district Championship was something special for players and coaches to be involved in, it is fantastic to see it being revived. It’s a huge privilege to be asked to work with the best coaches and players in the Edinburgh District. We want to create an environment the players fall in love with and go back and tell their club mates how great the experience was. I’m especially looking forward to our game at Netherdale because I know the Borders fans will buy into this and make it a great occasion. I really hope this is the start of the re-emergence of the competition, and that it goes from strength to strength over the next few seasons.

Honours

Season standings

Inter-City

Glasgow score given first.  ᵜ  Previous to 1876 only goals counted; tries were ignored in the result.

Scoreline key:

Twice a season matches

Annual matches

Scottish Inter-District Championship

The Inter-City match was then incorporated into the Scottish Inter-District Championship. For Glasgow's professional championship results from 1996 see Glasgow Warriors; for results of later Glasgow - Edinburgh matches see 1872 Cup.

Professional Era

The Amateur Scottish Inter-District Championship has been restarted twice in the professional era. The first restart was from 1999 to 2002; the second restart from the 2022-23 season.

Partial list of games played against international opposition

24 November 1962: Edinburgh 22–3 Canada, at Murrayfield
19 November 1975: Edinburgh 10–19 Australia, at Myreside
31 October 1979: Edinburgh 4–16 New Zealand, at Myreside 
19 September 1981: Edinburgh 13–18 Romania, at Myreside 
15 September 1982: Edinburgh 47–12 Fiji, at Myreside 
26 October 1983: Edinburgh 6–22 New Zealand, at Myreside 
23 September 1986: Edinburgh 26–14 Japan, at Myreside 
23 September 1987: Edinburgh 9–22 France, at Goldenacre
9 November 1988: Edinburgh 19–25 Australia, at Myreside 
8 November 1995: Edinburgh 22–35 Western Samoa, at Inverleith
24 August 2007: Edinburgh 14-26 Tonga, at Myreside

Notable players

 James Robertson - world's first black rugby union player.
 Eric Liddell - won the 1924 Olympic gold medal for the 400 metres in athletics.

See also
Edinburgh Rugby

References

Scottish rugby union teams
Rugby clubs established in 1872
Scottish Inter-District Championship teams
District
Scottish District sides